The red fox (Vulpes vulpes) is the largest of the true foxes and one of the most widely distributed members of the order Carnivora, being present across the entire Northern Hemisphere including most of North America, Europe and Asia, plus parts of North Africa. It is listed as least concern by the IUCN. Its range has increased alongside human expansion, having been introduced to Australia, where it is considered harmful to native mammals and bird populations. Due to its presence in Australia, it is included on the list of the "world's 100 worst invasive species".

The red fox originated from smaller-sized ancestors from Eurasia during the Middle Villafranchian period, and colonised North America shortly after the Wisconsin glaciation. Among the true foxes, the red fox represents a more progressive form in the direction of carnivory. Apart from its large size, the red fox is distinguished from other fox species by its ability to adapt quickly to new environments. Despite its name, the species often produces individuals with other colourings, including leucistic and melanistic individuals. Forty-five subspecies are currently recognised, which are divided into two categories: the large northern foxes and the small, basal southern grey desert foxes of Asia and North Africa.

Red foxes are usually found in pairs or small groups consisting of families, such as a mated pair and their young, or a male with several females having kinship ties. The young of the mated pair remain with their parents to assist in caring for new kits. The species primarily feeds on small rodents, though it may also target rabbits, squirrels, game birds, reptiles, invertebrates and young ungulates. Fruit and vegetable matter is also eaten sometimes. Although the red fox tends to kill smaller predators, including other fox species, it is vulnerable to attack from larger predators, such as wolves, coyotes, golden jackals, large predatory birds such as golden eagles and Eurasian eagle owls, and medium- and large-sized felines.

The species has a long history of association with humans, having been extensively hunted as a pest and furbearer for many centuries, as well as being represented in human folklore and mythology. Because of its widespread distribution and large population, the red fox is one of the most important furbearing animals harvested for the fur trade. Too small to pose a threat to humans, it has extensively benefited from the presence of human habitation, and has successfully colonised many suburban and urban areas. Domestication of the red fox is also underway in Russia, and has resulted in the domesticated red fox.

Terminology

Males are called tods or dogs, females are called vixens, and young cubs are known as kits. Although the Arctic fox has a small native population in northern Scandinavia, and while the corsac fox's range extends into European Russia, the red fox is the only fox native to Western Europe, and so is simply called "the fox" in colloquial British English.

Etymology
The word "fox" comes from Old English, which derived from Proto-Germanic *fuhsaz. Compare with West Frisian foks, Dutch vos, and German Fuchs. This, in turn, derives from Proto-Indo-European *puḱ- 'thick-haired; tail'. Compare to the Hindi pū̃ch 'tail', Tocharian B päkā 'tail; chowrie', and Lithuanian paustìs 'fur'. The bushy tail also forms the basis for the fox's Welsh name, llwynog, literally 'bushy', from llwyn 'bush'. Likewise,  from rabo 'tail', Lithuanian uodẽgis from uodegà 'tail', and Ojibwe waagosh from waa, which refers to the up and down "bounce" or flickering of an animal or its tail. 

The scientific term vulpes derives from the Latin word for fox, and gives the adjectives vulpine and vulpecular.

Evolution

The red fox is considered a more specialised form of Vulpes than the Afghan, corsac and Bengal foxes in the direction of size and adaptation to carnivory; the skull displays far fewer neotenous traits than in other species, and its facial area is more developed. It is, however, not as adapted for a purely carnivorous diet as the Tibetan fox.

Origins
The species is Eurasian in origin, and may have evolved from either Vulpes alopecoides or the related Chinese V. chikushanensis, both of which lived during the Middle Villafranchian. The earliest fossil specimens of V. vulpes were uncovered in Baranya, Hungary dating from 3.4 to 1.8 million years ago. The ancestral species was likely smaller than the current one, as the earliest red fox fossils are smaller than modern populations. The earliest fossil remains of the modern species date back to the mid-Pleistocene in association with the refuse of early human settlements. This has led to the theory that the red fox was hunted by primitive humans as both a source of food and pelts.

Colonisation of North America
Red foxes colonised the North American continent in two waves: before or during the Illinoian glaciation, and during the Wisconsinan glaciation. Gene mapping demonstrates that red foxes in North America have been isolated from their Old World counterparts for over 400,000 years, thus raising the possibility that speciation has occurred, and that the previous binomial name of Vulpes fulva may be valid. In the far north, red fox fossils have been found in Sangamonian Stage deposits in the Fairbanks District and Medicine Hat. Fossils dating from the Wisconsinan are present in 25 sites in Arkansas, California, Colorado, Idaho, Missouri, New Mexico, Tennessee, Texas, Virginia, and Wyoming. Although they ranged far south during the Wisconsinan, the onset of warm conditions shrank their range toward the north, and they have only recently reclaimed their former American ranges because of human-induced environmental changes. Genetic testing indicates two distinct red fox refugia exist in North America, which have been separated since the Wisconsinan. The northern (or boreal) refugium occurs in Alaska and western Canada, and consists of the large subspecies V. v. alascensis, V. v. abietorum, V. v. regalis, and V. v. rubricosa. The southern (or montane) refugium occurs in the subalpine parklands and alpine meadows of the Rocky Mountains, the Cascade Range, and Sierra Nevada, and consists of the small subspecies V. v. cascadensis, V. v. macroura, V. v. necator, and V. v. patwin. The latter clade has been separated from all other red fox populations since the last glacial maximum, and may possess unique ecological or physiological adaptations.

Although European foxes (V. v. crucigera) were introduced to portions of the United States in the 1900s, recent genetic investigation indicates an absence of European fox haplotypes in any North American populations. Also, introduced eastern American red foxes have colonized southern California, the San Joaquin Valley, and San Francisco Bay Area, but appear to have mixed with the Sacramento Valley red fox (V. v. patwin) only in a narrow hybrid zone. In addition, no evidence is seen of interbreeding of eastern American red foxes in California with the montane Sierra Nevada red fox (V. v. necator) or other populations in the Intermountain West (between the Rocky Mountains to the east and the Cascade and Sierra Nevada Mountains to the west).

Subspecies

The 3rd edition of Mammal Species of the World listed 45 subspecies as valid. In 2010, a distinct 46th subspecies, the Sacramento Valley red fox (V. v. patwin), which inhabits the grasslands of the Sacramento Valley, was identified through mitochondrial haplotype studies. Castello (2018) recognized 30 subspecies of the Old World red fox and nine subspecies of the North American red fox as valid.

Substantial gene pool mixing between different subspecies is known; British red foxes have crossbred extensively with red foxes imported from Germany, France, Belgium, Sardinia and possibly Siberia and Scandinavia. However, genetic studies suggest very little differences between red foxes sampled across Europe. Lack of genetic diversity is consistent with the red fox being a highly agile species, with one red fox covering  in under a year's time.

Red fox subspecies in Eurasia and North Africa are divided into two categories:
Northern foxes are large and brightly coloured.
Southern grey desert foxes include the Asian subspecies V. v. griffithi, V. v. pusilla, and V. v. flavescens. These foxes display transitional features between the northern foxes and other, smaller fox species; their skulls possess more primitive, neotenous traits than the northern foxes and they are much smaller; the maximum sizes attained by southern grey desert foxes are invariably less than the average sizes of northern foxes. Their limbs are also longer and their ears larger.

Red foxes living in Middle Asia show physical traits intermediate to the northern foxes and southern grey desert foxes.

Description

Build

The red fox has an elongated body and relatively short limbs. The tail, which is longer than half the body length (70 percent of head and body length), is fluffy and reaches the ground when in a standing position. Their pupils are oval and vertically oriented. Nictitating membranes are present, but move only when the eyes are closed. The forepaws have five digits, while the hind feet have only four and lack dewclaws. They are very agile, being capable of jumping over  fences, and swim well. Vixens normally have four pairs of teats, though vixens with seven, nine, or ten teats are not uncommon. The testes of males are smaller than those of Arctic foxes.

Their skulls are fairly narrow and elongated, with small braincases. Their canine teeth are relatively long. Sexual dimorphism of the skull is more pronounced than in corsac foxes, with female red foxes tending to have smaller skulls than males, with wider nasal regions and hard palates, as well as having larger canines. Their skulls are distinguished from those of dogs by their narrower muzzles, less crowded premolars, more slender canine teeth, and concave rather than convex profiles.

Dimensions
Red foxes are the largest species of the genus Vulpes. However, relative to dimensions, red foxes are much lighter than similarly sized dogs of the genus Canis. Their limb bones, for example, weigh 30 percent less per unit area of bone than expected for similarly sized dogs. They display significant individual, sexual, age and geographical variation in size. The ears measure  and the hind feet . They have a stride of  when walking at a normal pace. North American red foxes are generally lightly built, with comparatively long bodies for their mass and have a high degree of sexual dimorphism. British red foxes are heavily built, but short, while continental European red foxes are closer to the general average among red fox populations.

Fur

The winter fur is dense, soft, silky and relatively long. For the northern foxes, the fur is very long, dense and fluffy, but it is shorter, sparser and coarser in southern forms. Among northern foxes, the North American varieties generally have the silkiest guard hairs, while most Eurasian red foxes have coarser fur. The fur in "thermal windows" areas such as the head and the lower legs is kept dense and short all year round, while fur in other areas changes with the seasons. The foxes actively control the peripheral vasodilation and peripheral vasoconstriction in these areas to regulate heat loss. There are three main colour morphs; red, silver/black and cross (see Mutations). In the typical red morph, their coats are generally bright reddish-rusty with yellowish tints. A stripe of weak, diffuse patterns of many brown-reddish-chestnut hairs occurs along the spine. Two additional stripes pass down the shoulder blades, which, together with the spinal stripe, form a cross. The lower back is often a mottled silvery colour. The flanks are lighter coloured than the back, while the chin, lower lips, throat and front of the chest are white. The remaining lower surface of the body is dark, brown or reddish. During lactation, the belly fur of vixens may turn brick red. The upper parts of the limbs are rusty reddish, while the paws are black. The frontal part of the face and upper neck is bright brownish-rusty red, while the upper lips are white. The backs of the ears are black or brownish-reddish, while the inner surface is whitish. The top of the tail is brownish-reddish, but lighter in colour than the back and flanks. The underside of the tail is pale grey with a straw-coloured tint. A black spot, the location of the supracaudal gland, is usually present at the base of the tail. The tip of the tail is white.

Colour morphs

Atypical colouration in red foxes usually represents stages toward full melanism, and mostly occurs in cold regions.

Senses
Red foxes have binocular vision, but their sight reacts mainly to movement. They are capable of locating sounds to within one degree at 700–3,000 Hz, though less accurately at higher frequencies. Their sense of smell is good, but weaker than that of specialised dogs.

Scent glands
Red foxes have a pair of anal sacs lined by sebaceous glands, both of which open through a single duct. The anal sacs act as fermentation chambers in which aerobic and anaerobic bacteria convert sebum into odorous compounds, including aliphatic acids. The presence of foot glands is equivocal. The interdigital cavities are deep, with a reddish tinge and smell strongly. Sebaceous glands are present on the angle of the jaw and mandible.

Distribution and habitat

The red fox is a wide-ranging species. Its range covers nearly  including as far north as the Arctic Circle. It occurs all across Europe, in Africa north of the Sahara Desert, throughout Asia apart from extreme Southeast Asia, and across North America apart from most of the southwestern United States and Mexico. It is absent in Greenland, Iceland, the Arctic islands, the most northern parts of central Siberia, and in extreme deserts.
It is not present in New Zealand and is classed as a "prohibited new organism" under the Hazardous Substances and New Organisms Act 1996, which does not allow import.

Australia

In Australia, estimates in 2012 indicated that there were more than 7.2 million red foxes, with a range extending throughout most of the continental mainland. They became established in Australia through successive introductions in 1830s and 1840s, by settlers in the British colonies of Van Diemen's Land (as early as 1833) and the Port Phillip District of New South Wales (as early as 1845), who wanted to foster the traditional English sport of fox hunting. A permanent red fox population did not establish itself on the island of Tasmania, and it is widely held that foxes were out-competed by the Tasmanian devil. On the mainland, however, the species was successful as an apex predator. The fox is generally less common in areas where the dingo is more prevalent, but it has, primarily through its burrowing behaviour, achieved niche differentiation with both the feral dog and the feral cat. Consequently, the fox has become one of the continent's most destructive invasive species. 

The red fox has been implicated in the extinction or decline of several native Australian species, particularly those of the family Potoroidae, including the desert rat-kangaroo. The spread of red foxes across the southern part of the continent has coincided with the spread of rabbits in Australia, and corresponds with declines in the distribution of several medium-sized ground-dwelling mammals, including brush-tailed bettongs, burrowing bettongs, rufous bettongs, bilbys, numbats, bridled nail-tail wallabies and quokkas. Most of those species are now limited to areas (such as islands) where red foxes are absent or rare. Local fox eradication programs exist, although elimination has proven difficult due to the fox's denning behaviour and nocturnal hunting, so the focus is on management, including the introduction of state bounties. According to the Tasmanian government, red foxes were accidentally introduced to the previously fox-free island of Tasmania in 1999 or 2000, posing a significant threat to native wildlife, including the eastern bettong, and an eradication program was initiated, conducted by the Tasmanian Department of Primary Industries and Water.

Sardinia, Italy
The origin of the ichnusae subspecies in Sardinia, Italy is uncertain, as it is absent from Pleistocene deposits in their current homeland. It is possible it originated during the Neolithic following its introduction to the island by humans. It is likely then that Sardinian fox populations stem from repeated introductions of animals from different localities in the Mediterranean. This latter theory may explain the subspecies' phenotypic diversity.

Behaviour

Social and territorial behaviour

Red foxes either establish stable home ranges within particular areas or are itinerant with no fixed abode. They use their urine to mark their territories. A male fox raises one hind leg and his urine is sprayed forward in front of him, whereas a female fox squats down so that the urine is sprayed in the ground between the hind legs. Urine is also used to mark empty cache sites, used to store found food, as reminders not to waste time investigating them. The use of up to 12 different urination postures allows them to precisely control the position of the scent mark. Red foxes live in family groups sharing a joint territory. In favourable habitats and/or areas with low hunting pressure, subordinate foxes may be present in a range. Subordinate foxes may number one or two, sometimes up to eight in one territory. These subordinates could be formerly dominant animals, but are mostly young from the previous year, who act as helpers in rearing the breeding vixen's kits. Alternatively, their presence has been explained as being in response to temporary surpluses of food unrelated to assisting reproductive success. Non-breeding vixens will guard, play, groom, provision and retrieve kits, an example of kin selection. Red foxes may leave their families once they reach adulthood if the chances of winning a territory of their own are high. If not, they will stay with their parents, at the cost of postponing their own reproduction.

Reproduction and development

Red foxes reproduce once a year in spring. Two months prior to oestrus (typically December), the reproductive organs of vixens change shape and size. By the time they enter their oestrus period, their uterine horns double in size, and their ovaries grow 1.5–2 times larger. Sperm formation in males begins in August–September, with the testicles attaining their greatest weight in December–February. The vixen's oestrus period lasts three weeks, during which the dog-foxes mate with the vixens for several days, often in burrows.  The male's bulbus glandis enlarges during copulation, forming a copulatory tie which may last for more than an hour. The gestation period lasts 49–58 days. Though foxes are largely monogamous, DNA evidence from one population indicated large levels of polygyny, incest and mixed paternity litters. Subordinate vixens may become pregnant, but usually fail to whelp, or have their kits killed postpartum by either the dominant female or other subordinates.

The average litter size consists of four to six kits, though litters of up to 13 kits have occurred. Large litters are typical in areas where fox mortality is high. Kits are born blind, deaf and toothless, with dark brown fluffy fur. At birth, they are short-legged, large-headed and have broad chests. Mothers remain with the kits for 2–3 weeks, as they are unable to thermoregulate. During this period, the fathers or barren vixens feed the mothers. Vixens are very protective of their kits, and have been known to even fight off terriers in their defence. If the mother dies before the kits are independent, the father takes over as their provider. The kits' eyes open after 13–15 days, during which time their ear canals open and their upper teeth erupt, with the lower teeth emerging 3–4 days later. Their eyes are initially blue, but change to amber at 4–5 weeks. Coat colour begins to change at three weeks of age, when the black eye streak appears. By one month, red and white patches are apparent on their faces. During this time, their ears erect and their muzzles elongate. Kits begin to leave their dens and experiment with solid food brought by their parents at the age of 3–4 weeks. The lactation period lasts 6–7 weeks. Their woolly coats begin to be coated by shiny guard hairs after 8 weeks. By the age of 3–4 months, the kits are long-legged, narrow-chested and sinewy. They reach adult proportions at the age of 6–7 months. Some vixens may reach sexual maturity at the age of 9–10 months, thus bearing their first litters at one year of age. In captivity, their longevity can be as long as 15 years, though in the wild they typically do not survive past 5 years of age.

Denning behaviour

Outside the breeding season, most red foxes favour living in the open, in densely vegetated areas, though they may enter burrows to escape bad weather. Their burrows are often dug on hill or mountain slopes, ravines, bluffs, steep banks of water bodies, ditches, depressions, gutters, in rock clefts and neglected human environments. Red foxes prefer to dig their burrows on well drained soils. Dens built among tree roots can last for decades, while those dug on the steppes last only several years. They may permanently abandon their dens during mange outbreaks, possibly as a defence mechanism against the spread of disease. In the Eurasian desert regions, foxes may use the burrows of wolves, porcupines and other large mammals, as well as those dug by gerbil colonies. Compared to burrows constructed by Arctic foxes, badgers, marmots and corsac foxes, red fox dens are not overly complex. Red fox burrows are divided into a den and temporary burrows, which consist only of a small passage or cave for concealment. The main entrance of the burrow leads downwards (40–45°) and broadens into a den, from which numerous side tunnels branch. When kits are born, the discarded debris is trampled, thus forming a spot where the kits can play and receive food. They may share their dens with woodchucks or badgers. Unlike badgers, which fastidiously clean their earths and defecate in latrines, red foxes habitually leave pieces of prey around their dens. The average sleep time of a captive red fox is 9.8 hours per day.

Communication

Body language

Red fox body language consists of movements of the ears, tail and postures, with their body markings emphasising certain gestures. Postures can be divided into aggressive/dominant and fearful/submissive categories. Some postures may blend the two together.
Inquisitive foxes will rotate and flick their ears whilst sniffing. Playful individuals will perk their ears and rise on their hind legs. Male foxes courting females, or after successfully evicting intruders, will turn their ears outwardly, and raise their tails in a horizontal position, with the tips raised upward. When afraid, red foxes grin in submission, arching their backs, curving their bodies, crouching their legs and lashing their tails back and forth with their ears pointing backwards and pressed against their skulls. When merely expressing submission to a dominant animal, the posture is similar, but without arching the back or curving the body. Submissive foxes will approach dominant animals in a low posture, so that their muzzles reach up in greeting. When two evenly matched foxes confront each other over food, they approach each other sideways and push against each other's flanks, betraying a mixture of fear and aggression through lashing tails and arched backs without crouching and pulling their ears back without flattening them against their skulls. When launching an assertive attack, red foxes approach directly rather than sideways, with their tails aloft and their ears rotated sideways. During such fights, red foxes will stand on each other's upper bodies with their forelegs, using open mouthed threats. Such fights typically only occur among juveniles or adults of the same sex.

Vocalisations

Red foxes have a wide vocal range, and produce different sounds spanning five octaves, which grade into each other. Recent analyses identify 12 different sounds produced by adults and 8 by kits. The majority of sounds can be divided into "contact" and "interaction" calls. The former vary according to the distance between individuals, while the latter vary according to the level of aggression.

Contact calls: The most commonly heard contact call is a three to five syllable barking "wow wow wow" sound, which is often made by two foxes approaching one another. This call is most frequently heard from December to February (when they can be confused with the territorial calls of tawny owls). The "wow wow wow" call varies according to individual; captive foxes have been recorded to answer pre-recorded calls of their pen-mates, but not those of strangers. Kits begin emitting the "wow wow wow" call at the age of 19 days, when craving attention. When red foxes draw close together, they emit trisyllabic greeting warbles similar to the clucking of chickens. Adults greet their kits with gruff huffing noises.
Interaction calls: When greeting one another, red foxes emit high pitched whines, particularly submissive animals. A submissive fox approached by a dominant animal will emit a ululating siren-like shriek. During aggressive encounters with conspecifics, they emit a throaty rattling sound, similar to a ratchet, called "gekkering". Gekkering occurs mostly during the courting season from rival males or vixens rejecting advances. Both tamed and domesticated foxes have been observed making sounds similar to laughter, which is believed to be used as a contact call when communicating with human owners and handlers.

Another call that does not fit into the two categories is a long, drawn-out, monosyllabic "waaaaah" sound. As it is commonly heard during the breeding season, it is thought to be emitted by vixens summoning males. When danger is detected, foxes emit a monosyllabic bark. At close quarters, it is a muffled cough, while at long distances it is sharper. Kits make warbling whimpers when nursing, these calls being especially loud when they are dissatisfied.

Ecology

Diet, hunting and feeding behaviour

Red foxes are omnivores with a highly varied diet. Research conducted in the former Soviet Union showed red foxes consuming over 300 animal species and a few dozen species of plants. They primarily feed on small rodents like voles, mice, ground squirrels, hamsters, gerbils, woodchucks, pocket gophers and deer mice. Secondary prey species include birds (with Passeriformes, Galliformes and waterfowl predominating), leporids, porcupines, raccoons, opossums, reptiles, insects, other invertebrates, flotsam (marine mammals, fish and echinoderms) and carrion. On very rare occasions, foxes may attack young or small ungulates such as goat kids, lambs and small deer or fawns. Red foxes readily eat plant material and in some areas fruit can amount to 100% of their diet in autumn. Commonly consumed fruits include blueberries, blackberries, raspberries, cherries, persimmons, mulberries, apples, plums, grapes and acorns. Other plant material includes grasses, sedges and tubers.

Red foxes are implicated in the predation of game and song birds, hares, rabbits, muskrats and young ungulates, particularly in preserves, reserves and hunting farms where ground-nesting birds are protected and raised, as well as in poultry farms.

While the popular consensus is that olfaction is very important for hunting, two studies that experimentally investigated the role of olfactory, auditory and visual cues found that visual cues are the most important ones for hunting in red foxes and coyotes.

Red foxes prefer to hunt in the early morning hours before sunrise and late evening. Although they typically forage alone, they may aggregate in resource-rich environments. They typically only feed on carrion in the late evening hours and at night. They are extremely possessive of their food and will defend their catches from even dominant animals. Red foxes may occasionally commit acts of surplus killing; during one breeding season, four red foxes were recorded to have killed around 200 black-headed gulls each, with peaks during dark, windy hours when flying conditions were unfavourable. Losses to poultry and penned game birds can be substantial because of this. Red foxes seem to dislike the taste of moles, but will nonetheless catch them alive and present them to their kits as playthings.

A 2008–2010 study of 84 red foxes in the Czech Republic and Germany found that successful hunting in long vegetation or under snow appeared to involve an alignment of the red fox with the Earth's magnetic field.

Enemies and competitors

Red foxes typically dominate other fox species. Arctic foxes generally escape competition from red foxes by living farther north, where food is too scarce to support the larger-bodied red species. Although the red species' northern limit is linked to the availability of food, the Arctic species' southern range is limited by the presence of the former. Red and Arctic foxes were both introduced to almost every island from the Aleutian Islands to the Alexander Archipelago during the 1830s–1930s by fur companies. The red foxes invariably displaced the Arctic foxes, with one male red fox having been reported to have killed off all resident Arctic foxes on a small island in 1866. Where they are sympatric, Arctic foxes may also escape competition by feeding on lemmings and flotsam rather than voles, as favoured by red foxes. Both species will kill each other's kits, given the opportunity. Red foxes are serious competitors of corsac foxes, as they hunt the same prey all year. Corsac foxes seem to only outcompete red foxes in semi-desert and steppe areas. In Israel, Blanford's foxes escape competition with red foxes by restricting themselves to rocky cliffs and actively avoiding the open plains inhabited by red foxes. Red foxes dominate kit and swift foxes. Kit foxes usually avoid competition with their larger cousins by living in more arid environments, though red foxes have been increasing in ranges formerly occupied by kit foxes due to human-induced environmental changes. Red foxes will kill both species and compete with them for food and den sites. Grey foxes are exceptional, as they dominate red foxes wherever their ranges meet. Historically, interactions between the two species were rare, as grey foxes favoured heavily wooded or semiarid habitats as opposed to the open and mesic ones preferred by red foxes. However, interactions have become more frequent due to deforestation, allowing red foxes to colonise grey fox-inhabited areas.

Wolves may kill and eat red foxes in disputes over carcasses. In areas in North America where red fox and coyote populations are sympatric, red fox ranges tend to be located outside coyote territories. The principal cause of this separation is believed to be active avoidance of coyotes by the red foxes. Interactions between the two species vary in nature, ranging from active antagonism to indifference. The majority of aggressive encounters are initiated by coyotes, and there are few reports of red foxes acting aggressively toward coyotes except when attacked or when their kits were approached. Foxes and coyotes have sometimes been seen feeding together. In Israel, red foxes share their habitat with golden jackals. Where their ranges meet, the two canids compete due to near-identical diets. Red foxes ignore golden jackal scents or tracks in their territories and avoid close physical proximity with golden jackals themselves. In areas where golden jackals become very abundant, the population of red foxes decreases significantly, apparently because of competitive exclusion.

Red foxes dominate raccoon dogs, sometimes killing their kits or biting adults to death. Cases are known of red foxes killing raccoon dogs after entering their dens. Both species compete for mouse-like prey. This competition reaches a peak during early spring when food is scarce. In Tatarstan, red fox predation accounted for 11.1% of deaths among 54 raccoon dogs and amounted to 14.3% of 186 raccoon dog deaths in northwestern Russia.

Red foxes may kill small mustelids like weasels, stone martens, pine martens, stoats, kolonoks, polecats and young sables. Eurasian badgers may live alongside red foxes in isolated sections of large burrows. It is possible that the two species tolerate each other out of mutualism; red foxes provide Eurasian badgers with food scraps, while Eurasian badgers maintain the shared burrow's cleanliness. However, cases are known of Eurasian badgers driving vixens from their dens and destroying their litters without eating them. Wolverines may kill red foxes, often while the latter are sleeping or near carrion. Red foxes, in turn, may kill young wolverines.

Red foxes may compete with striped hyenas on large carcasses. Red foxes may give way to striped hyenas on unopened carcasses, as the latter's stronger jaws can easily tear open flesh that is too tough for red foxes. Red foxes may harass striped hyenas, using their smaller size and greater speed to avoid the hyena's attacks. Sometimes, red foxes seem to deliberately torment striped hyenas even when there is no food at stake. Some red foxes may mis-time their attacks and are killed. Red fox remains are often found in striped hyena dens and striped hyenas may steal red foxes from traps.

In Eurasia, red foxes may be preyed upon by leopards, caracals and Eurasian lynxes. The Eurasian lynxes chase red foxes into deep snow, where their longer legs and larger paws give them an advantage over red foxes, especially when the depth of the snow exceeds one metre. In the Velikoluksky District in Russia, red foxes are absent or are seen only occasionally where Eurasian lynxes establish permanent territories. Researchers consider Eurasian lynxes to represent considerably less danger to red foxes than wolves do. North American felid predators of red foxes include cougars, Canada lynxes and bobcats. Occasionally, large raptors such as Eurasian eagle-owls will prey on young foxes(and adults on rare occasion), while golden eagles, wedge-tailed eagles, white-tailed eagles, steller's sea eagles have been known to kill adults.

Diseases and parasites

Red foxes are the most important rabies vector in Europe. In London, arthritis is common in foxes, being particularly frequent in the spine. Foxes may be infected with leptospirosis and tularemia, though they are not overly susceptible to the latter. They may also fall ill from listeriosis and spirochetosis, as well as acting as vectors in spreading erysipelas, brucellosis and tick-borne encephalitis. A mysterious fatal disease near Lake Sartlan in the Novosibirsk Oblast was noted among local red foxes, but the cause was undetermined. The possibility was considered that it was caused by an acute form of encephalomyelitis, which was first observed in captive-bred silver foxes. Individual cases of foxes infected with Yersinia pestis are known.

Red foxes are not readily prone to infestation with fleas. Species like Spilopsyllus cuniculi are probably only caught from the fox's prey species, while others like Archaeopsylla erinacei are caught whilst traveling. Fleas that feed on red foxes include Pulex irritans, Ctenocephalides canis and Paraceras melis. Ticks such as Ixodes ricinus and I. hexagonus are not uncommon in red foxes, and are typically found on nursing vixens and kits still in their earths. The louse Trichodectes vulpis specifically targets red foxes, but is found infrequently. The mite Sarcoptes scabiei is the most important cause of mange in red foxes. It causes extensive hair loss, starting from the base of the tail and hindfeet, then the rump before moving on to the rest of the body. In the final stages of the condition, red foxes can lose most of their fur, 50% of their body weight and may gnaw at infected extremities. In the epizootic phase of the disease, it usually takes red foxes four months to die after infection. Other endoparasites include Demodex folliculorum, Notoderes, Otodectes cynotis (which is frequently found in the ear canal), Linguatula serrata (which infects the nasal passages) and ringworms.

Up to 60 helminth species are known to infect captive-bred foxes in fur farms, while 20 are known in the wild. Several coccidian species of the genera Isospora and Eimeria are also known to infect them. The most common nematode species found in red fox guts are Toxocara canis and Uncinaria stenocephala, Capillaria aerophila and Crenosoma vulpis; the latter two infect their lungs. Capillaria plica infects the red fox's bladder. Trichinella spiralis rarely affects them. The most common tapeworm species in red foxes are Taenia spiralis and T. pisiformis. Others include Echinococcus granulosus and E. multilocularis. Eleven trematode species infect red foxes, including Metorchis conjunctus.

Relationships with humans

In folklore, religion and mythology

Red foxes feature prominently in the folklore and mythology of human cultures with which they are sympatric. In Greek mythology, the Teumessian fox, or Cadmean vixen, was a gigantic fox that was destined never to be caught. The fox was one of the children of Echidna.

In Celtic mythology, the red fox is a symbolic animal. In the Cotswolds, witches were thought to take the shape of foxes to steal butter from their neighbours. In later European folklore, the figure of Reynard the Fox symbolises trickery and deceit. He originally appeared (then under the name of "Reinardus") as a secondary character in the 1150 poem "Ysengrimus". He reappeared in 1175 in Pierre Saint Cloud's Le Roman de Renart, and made his debut in England in Geoffrey Chaucer's The Nun's Priest's Tale. Many of Reynard's adventures may stem from actual observations on fox behaviour; he is an enemy of the wolf and has a fondness for blackberries and grapes.

Chinese folk tales tell of fox-spirits called huli jing that may have up to nine tails, or kumiho as they are known in Korea. In Japanese mythology, the kitsune are fox-like spirits possessing magical abilities that increase with their age and wisdom. Foremost among these is the ability to assume human form. While some folktales speak of kitsune employing this ability to trick others, other stories portray them as faithful guardians, friends, lovers, and wives. In Arab folklore, the fox is considered a cowardly, weak, deceitful, and cunning animal, said to feign death by filling its abdomen with air to appear bloated, then lies on its side, awaiting the approach of unwitting prey. The animal's cunning was noted by the authors of the Bible who applied the word "fox" to false prophets (Ezekiel 13:4) and the hypocrisy of Herod Antipas (Luke 13:32).

The cunning Fox is commonly found in Native American mythology, where it is portrayed as an almost constant companion to Coyote. Fox, however, is a deceitful companion that often steals Coyote's food. In the Achomawi creation myth, Fox and Coyote are the co-creators of the world, that leave just before the arrival of humans. The Yurok tribe believed that Fox, in anger, captured the Sun, and tied him to a hill, causing him to burn a great hole in the ground. An Inuit story tells of how Fox, portrayed as a beautiful woman, tricks a hunter into marrying her, only to resume her true form and leave after he offends her. A Menominee story tells of how Fox is an untrustworthy friend to Wolf.

Hunting

The earliest historical records of fox hunting come from the 4th century BC; Alexander the Great is known to have hunted foxes and a seal dated from 350 BC depicts a Persian horseman in the process of spearing a fox. Xenophon, who viewed hunting as part of a cultured man's education, advocated the killing of foxes as pests, as they distracted hounds from hares. The Romans were hunting foxes by AD 80. During the Dark Ages in Europe, foxes were considered secondary quarries, but gradually grew in importance. Cnut the Great re-classed foxes as Beasts of the Chase, a lower category of quarry than Beasts of Venery. Foxes were gradually hunted less as vermin and more as Beasts of the Chase, to the point that by the late 1200s, Edward I had a royal pack of foxhounds and a specialised fox huntsman. In this period, foxes were increasingly hunted above ground with hounds, rather than underground with terriers. Edward, Second Duke of York assisted the climb of foxes as more prestigious quarries in his The Master of Game. By the Renaissance, fox hunting became a traditional sport of the nobility. After the English Civil War caused a drop in deer populations, fox hunting grew in popularity. By the mid-1600s, Great Britain was divided into fox hunting territories, with the first fox hunting clubs being formed (the first was the Charlton Hunt Club in 1737). The popularity of fox hunting in Great Britain reached a peak during the 1700s. Although already native to North America, red foxes from England were imported for sporting purposes to Virginia and Maryland in 1730 by prosperous tobacco planters. These American fox hunters considered the red fox more sporting than the grey fox.

Red foxes are still widely persecuted as pests, with human-caused deaths among the highest causes of mortality in the species. Annual red fox kills are: UK 21,500–25,000 (2000); Germany 600,000 (2000–2001); Austria 58,000 (2000–2001); Sweden 58,000 (1999–2000); Finland 56,000 (2000–2001); Denmark 50,000 (1976–1977); Switzerland 34,832 (2001); Norway 17,000 (2000–2001); Saskatchewan (Canada) 2,000 (2000–2001); Nova Scotia (Canada) 491 (2000–2001); Minnesota (US) 4,000–8,000 (average annual trapping harvest 2002–2009); New Mexico (US) 69 (1999–2000).

Fur use

Red foxes are among the most important fur-bearing animals harvested by the fur trade. Their pelts are used for trimmings, scarfs, muffs, jackets and coats. They are principally used as trimming for both cloth coats and fur garments, including evening wraps. The pelts of silver foxes are popular as capes, while cross foxes are mostly used for scarves and rarely for trimming. The number of sold fox scarves exceeds the total number of scarves made from other fur-bearers. However, this amount is overshadowed by the total number of red fox pelts used for trimming purposes. The silver colour morphs are the most valued by furriers, followed by the cross colour morphs and the red colour morphs, respectively. In the early 1900s, over 1,000 American red fox skins were imported to Great Britain annually, while 500,000 were exported annually from Germany and Russia. The total worldwide trade of wild red foxes in 1985–86 was 1,543,995 pelts. Red foxes amounted to 45% of U.S. wild-caught pelts worth $50 million. Pelt prices are increasing, with 2012 North American wholesale auction prices averaging $39 and 2013 prices averaging $65.78.

North American red foxes, particularly those of northern Alaska, are the most valued for their fur, as they have guard hairs of a silky texture which, after dressing, allow the wearer unrestricted mobility. Red foxes living in southern Alaska's coastal areas and the Aleutian Islands are an exception, as they have extremely coarse pelts that rarely exceed one-third of the price of their northern Alaskan cousins. Most European peltries have coarse-textured fur compared to North American varieties. The only exceptions are the Nordic and Far Eastern Russian peltries, but they are still inferior to North American peltries in terms of silkiness.

Livestock and pet predation

Red foxes may on occasion prey on lambs. Usually, lambs targeted by red foxes tend to be physically weakened specimens, but not always. Lambs belonging to small breeds, such as the Scottish Blackface, are more vulnerable than larger breeds, such as the Merino. Twins may be more vulnerable to red foxes than singlets, as ewes cannot effectively defend both simultaneously. Crossbreeding small, upland ewes with larger, lowland rams can cause difficult and prolonged labour for ewes due to the heaviness of the resulting offspring, thus making the lambs more at risk to red fox predation. Lambs born from gimmers (ewes breeding for the first time) are more often killed by red foxes than those of experienced mothers, who stick closer to their young.

Red foxes may prey on domestic rabbits and guinea pigs if they are kept in open runs or are allowed to range freely in gardens. This problem is usually averted by housing them in robust hutches and runs. Urban red foxes frequently encounter cats and may feed alongside them. In physical confrontations, the cats usually have the upper hand. Authenticated cases of red foxes killing cats usually involve kittens. Although most red foxes do not prey on cats, some may do so and may treat them more as competitors rather than food.

Taming and domestication

In their unmodified wild state, red foxes are generally unsuitable as pets. Many supposedly abandoned kits are adopted by well-meaning people during the spring period, though it is unlikely that vixens would abandon their young. Actual orphans are rare and the ones that are adopted are likely kits that simply strayed from their den sites. Kits require almost constant supervision; when still suckling, they require milk at four-hour intervals day and night. Once weaned, they may become destructive to leather objects, furniture and electric cables. Though generally friendly toward people when young, captive red foxes become fearful of humans, save for their handlers, once they reach 10 weeks of age. They maintain their wild counterparts' strong instinct of concealment and may pose a threat to domestic birds, even when well-fed. Although suspicious of strangers, they can form bonds with cats and dogs, even ones bred for fox hunting. Tame red foxes were once used to draw ducks close to hunting blinds.

White to black individual red foxes have been selected and raised on fur farms as "silver foxes". In the second half of the 20th century, a lineage of domesticated silver foxes was developed by Russian geneticist Dmitry Belyayev who, over a 40-year period, bred several generations selecting only those individuals that showed the least fear of humans. Eventually, Belyayev's team selected only those that showed the most positive response to humans, thus resulting in a population of silver foxes whose behaviour and appearance was significantly changed. After about 10 generations of controlled breeding, these foxes no longer showed any fear of humans and often wagged their tails and licked their human caretakers to show affection. These behavioural changes were accompanied by physical alterations, which included piebald coats, floppy ears in kits and curled tails, similar to the traits that distinguish domestic dogs from grey wolves.

Urban red foxes

Distribution
Red foxes have been exceedingly successful in colonising built-up environments, especially lower-density suburbs, although many have also been sighted in dense urban areas far from the countryside. Throughout the 20th century, they have established themselves in many Australian, European, Japanese and North American cities. The species first colonised British cities during the 1930s, entering Bristol and London during the 1940s, and later established themselves in Cambridge and Norwich. In Ireland, they are now common in suburban Dublin. In Australia, red foxes were recorded in Melbourne as early as the 1930s, while in Zurich, Switzerland, they only started appearing in the 1980s. Urban red foxes are most common in residential suburbs consisting of privately owned, low-density housing. They are rare in areas where industry, commerce or council-rented houses predominate.

In 2006, it was estimated that there were 10,000 red foxes in London. City-dwelling red foxes may have the potential to consistently grow larger than their rural counterparts as a result of abundant scraps and a relative lack of predators. In cities, red foxes may scavenge food from litter bins and bin bags, although much of their diet is similar to rural red foxes.

Behaviour
Urban red foxes are most active at dusk and dawn, doing most of their hunting and scavenging at these times. It is uncommon to spot them during the day, but they can be caught sunbathing on roofs of houses or sheds. Urban red foxes will often make their homes in hidden and undisturbed spots in urban areas as well as on the edges of a city, visiting at night for sustenance. They sleep at night in dens. While urban red foxes will scavenge successfully in the city (and the red foxes tend to eat anything that humans eat) some urban residents will deliberately leave food out for the animals, finding them endearing. Doing this regularly can attract urban red foxes to one's home; they can become accustomed to human presence, warming up to their providers by allowing themselves to be approached and in some cases even played with, particularly young kits.

Urban red fox control
Urban red foxes can cause problems for local residents. They have been known to steal chickens, disrupt rubbish bins and damage gardens. Most complaints about urban red foxes made to local authorities occur during the breeding season in late January/early February or from late April to August when the new kits are developing. In the U.K., hunting red foxes in urban areas is banned and shooting them in an urban environment is not suitable. One alternative to hunting urban red foxes has been to trap them, which appears to be a more viable method. However, killing red foxes has little effect on the population in an urban area; those that are killed are very soon replaced, either by new kits during the breeding season or by other red foxes moving into the territory of those that were killed. A more effective method of urban red fox control is to deter them from the specific areas they inhabit. Deterrents such as creosote, diesel oil, or ammonia can be used. Cleaning up and blocking access to den locations can also discourage an urban red fox's return.

Relationship between urban and rural red foxes
In January 2014 it was reported that "Fleet", a relatively tame urban red fox tracked as part of a wider study by the University of Brighton in partnership with the BBC TV series Winterwatch, had unexpectedly traveled 195 miles in 21 days from his neighbourhood in Hove at the western edge of East Sussex across rural countryside as far as Rye, at the eastern edge of the county. He was still continuing his journey when the GPS collar stopped transmitting due to suspected water damage. Along with setting a record for the longest journey undertaken by a tracked red fox in the United Kingdom, his travels have highlighted the fluidity of movement between rural and urban red fox populations.

References

Further reading

External links

Red Fox, National Geographic
Natural History of the Red Fox, Wildlife Online
Sacramento Valley red fox info1
Red Fox, Fletcher Wildlife Garden

Vulpes
Holarctic fauna
Carnivorans of Asia
Carnivorans of Europe
Carnivorans of North America
Mammals of the Arctic
Arctic land animals
Introduced mammals of Australia
Mammals described in 1758
Taxa named by Carl Linnaeus
Articles containing video clips
Symbols of Mississippi
Extant Middle Pleistocene first appearances